Belchier is a surname. Notable people with the surname include:

Daubridgecourt Belchier (1580–1621), British dramatist
John Belchier (1706–1785), British surgeon

See also
 Belcher (surname)
 Belchier v Parsons

English-language surnames